The 1971 Tour of the Basque Country was the 11th edition of the Tour of the Basque Country cycle race and was held from 21 April to 25 April 1971. The race started and finished in Eibar. The race was won by Luis Ocaña of the Bic team.

General classification

References

1971
Bas